The Lakeside Jazz Festival is a yearly event held in Port Orange, Florida celebrating jazz music and photography.  Monies acquired by the festival are used to finance music scholarships for local high school students.

External links
Lakeside Jazz Festival website
Spruce Creek High School Band website
Spruce Creek High School Band Alumni website

Jazz festivals in the United States
Tourist attractions in Volusia County, Florida
Music festivals in Florida
Port Orange, Florida